Sir Thomas Leigh Hare, 1st Baronet,   (4 April 1859 – 22 February 1941) was a British Conservative politician and Member of Parliament. He represented South West Norfolk in the House of Commons between 1892 and 1906.

Thomas Leigh Hare was the illegitimate son of Sir Thomas Hare, 2nd Baronet (1807–1880).  He married Lady Ida Cathcart, daughter of Alan Cathcart, 3rd Earl Cathcart and Elizabeth Mary Crompton, on 24 July 1886. They had a daughter.

Hare and the Liberal Richard Winfrey fought four general elections against each other in South West Norfolk. Winfrey gained the seat at the third attempt and Hare tried to regain it in January 1910.

He was appointed a Member of the Royal Victorian Order (MVO) in May 1905. The Hare Baronetcy, of Stow Hall in the County of Norfolk, was created in 1905 for him; the title became extinct on his death in 1941.

References

External links 
 

1859 births
1941 deaths
Baronets in the Baronetage of the United Kingdom
Conservative Party (UK) MPs for English constituencies
Deputy Lieutenants of Norfolk
English justices of the peace
High Sheriffs of Norfolk
Members of the Royal Victorian Order
UK MPs 1892–1895
UK MPs 1895–1900
UK MPs 1900–1906
People from Stow Bardolph